Unión Ocopilla is a Peruvian football club, playing in the city of Huancayo, Junín, Peru.

History
In the 1969 Copa Perú, the club classified to the Final Stage, with the San Lorenzo de Almagro of Chiclayo, Carlos A. Mannucci of Trujillo, Salesianos of the Puno, FBC Melgar of Arequipa and Colegio Nacional de Iquitos. In the final stage, the club was fifth place.

In the 1970 Copa Perú, the club classified to the Final Stage, with the Atlético Torino of Talara, Defensor Casagrande of Trujillo, Deportivo Garcilaso of the Cusco, FBC Melgar of Arequipa and Colegio Nacional de Iquitos. In the final stage, the club was fourth place.

Honours

National
Liga Departamental de Junín: 2
 1969, 1970

See also
List of football clubs in Peru
Peruvian football league system

References 

Football clubs in Peru